At the Heart of Winter is the fifth studio album by Norwegian black metal band Immortal. It was released on February 22, 1999 through Osmose Productions. It is the first Immortal album not to feature Demonaz on guitar, as he suffered from acute tendinitis in his hands, as well as the last album until Sons of Northern Darkness to feature Abbath on bass. The album marks a shift in Immortal's musical sound, towards a black metal and thrash metal fusion.

Background 

At the Heart of Winter was recorded in November 1998 at Abyss Studios in Sweden. It is the first Immortal album not to feature a picture of the band on the cover, and the first to prominently feature the band's new logo, with the cover art was painted by J. P. Fournier.

Release 
In addition to a CD release, At the Heart of Winter was released as a limited-edition metal box, as well as a hand-numbered LP on Osmose, which was later reissued in 2005.

Reception 

At the Heart of Winter was well received by critics. John Serba of AllMusic praised the album, writing, "the result is a clarity and focus that few purveyors of the genre succeeded at finding, a painstakingly organized assemblage of black metal's base elements into a disciplined purity of metal that prefers the power of the almighty riff, instead of the occasionally overblown classical structuring of much-lauded stalwarts Emperor and Cradle of Filth, or the strange experimentation that Mayhem and Arcturus would undertake".

Track listing

Personnel 
Immortal
 Abbath Doom Occulta – vocals, guitar, bass, synthesizer
 Horgh – drums

Additional personnel
 Demonaz Doom Occulta – lyrics

References 

Immortal (band) albums
1999 albums
Osmose Productions albums
Albums produced by Peter Tägtgren
Albums with cover art by Jean-Pascal Fournier